Vuyisile Colossa (born 28 June 1982) is a South African professional mixed martial artist and kickboxer, a 5-time world champion in kickboxing and Muay Thai. He has been a professional competitor in kickboxing since 2002 and a professional MMA competitor since 2010.

Background
Originally from the mining town of Welkom, Thabong in South Africa, Colossa was active in sports growing up. At Leseding Technical School, Colossa competed in baseball, cricket, basketball, and rugby. Two years later, Colossa moved on to THS Welkom where he also began competing in hockey. At the age of 15, Colossa began training in kickboxing.

Career

Kickboxing and Muay Thai
Colossa finished in third place in the Free State Championships and was granted a spot on South Africa's first team. He then went on to win a bronze medal in the South Africa Fighting Championships. In 1999, he won the BIG Five Championships and came second in the Free State Championships. He then achieved second place in the 2000 SA Championships. In 2001, Colossa came third in the SA trials in Pretoria and was awarded his national colors. As a result of this success, he was chosen to represent South Africa in Vienna, Austria.

In 2002, he made his professional kickboxing debut. Colossa won his first two titles: South African Full-Contact Kickboxing Championship and the Ring Contact Fighting Art International Welterweight Kickboxing Champion Title. He received the Premier's Youth Award in Bloemfontein. He was honored by the department of Sport, Arts, Culture, Science and Technology for his exceptional achievement in the field of sport.

In 2003, he was crowned the South African Professional Kickboxing Council Champion, Muay Thai Champion and was also the runner-up for the W.A.K.O. Professional World Championship. Later that year, he attained his first degree black belt in Ring Contact Fighting Art. In 2006, he was the runner-up of the King of the Ring World Title, and then went on to make his debut in K-1 Khan Fighting in South Korea.

In 2008, Colossa competed in various major events in Asia. He faced Naruepol Fairtex at Planet Battle in Hong Kong in June 2008 and Yodsaenklai Fairtex at Planet Battle in November 2008.

In 2009, Colossa competed in I-1 World Grand Slam in Hong Kong in October and I-1 Grand Extreme in Macau in November, coming second in both four-man tournaments.

In January 2010, Colossa took part in his first reality TV show in Enfusion: Test of the Champions in Koh Samui, Thailand.  Later that year he won the Wu Lin Feng Golden Dragon Belt at King of the Ring Eight-man Tournament in Zhengzhou, China.

In June 2011 he became a contestant on The Challenger Muay Thai, where he won the Muay Thai Against Drugs belt against American Michael Chase Corley, during the series finale. The show was broadcast worldwide on AXN in September 2011, and continues to show on international networks around the world. At the end of that year he competed once again in I-1 Grand Slam four-man tournament in Hong Kong, this time emerging victorious with the belt.

On 3 April 2012, Colossa fought against the notable Muay Thai fighter Saiyok Pumpanmuang in the semi finals of the WMC tournament.

Mixed martial arts
Colossa made his professional MMA debut in May 2010.  He began his career with a record of 4-1 with his only defeat being a controversial decision loss to URCC Welterweight Champion Eduard Folayang.

Outside the ring, Colossa founded and held several IMPI World Series since 2014 with live coverage from NowTV Sports, gaining the reputation as Hong Kong's Original Caged MMA event.

ONE Fighting Championship
In September 2011, it was announced that Colossa had signed a 3 years contract with ONE Fighting Championship. He fought Ma Xing Yu at ONE Fighting Championship: Champion vs. Champion at the Singapore Indoor Stadium on 3 September, winning via stoppage early in the opening round. After the fight, Colossa announced that he wanted to fight for the One FC lightweight belt.

He faced Lowen Tynanes at ONE Fighting Championship: Return of Warriors in February 2013.  He lost the fight via rear-naked choke submission on the dying seconds of the third round.

Colossa rebounded with a series of wins in his two most recent appearances in ONE FC; he defeated Kotetsu Boku by decision in September 2013 and Caros Fodor by decision in December 2013.

In June 2014, it was announced that Colossa has signed with the UFC.  He was expected to make his debut for the promotion on 23 August 2014 at UFC Fight Night: Bisping vs. Le. However, a bout on that card never materialized and it appeared that he had a contract with ONE Fighting Championship that was due to expire in late September 2014.

Colossa was scheduled to face Caros Fodor in a rematch at ONE FC 20: Rise of the Kingdom taking place on 12 September 2014. However, Colossa pulled out at the last minute due to injury.

Championships and accomplishments

Kickboxing and Muay Thai
International Professional Combat Council
 2014 International Professional Combat Council(IPCC) 73 kg Champion

World Muaythai Council
 2012 WMC I-1 Champion
 2011 WMC Muaythai Against Drugs (MAD) Champion

King's Cup
 2010 King's Cup Finalist 

Wu Lin Feng
 2010 WLF 70 kg World 8 Man Tournament Champion

Ring Contact Fighting Art International
 2002 Ring Contact Fighting Art International Champion 
 South African RCFA Amateur Champion

South African Kickboxing Association 
 2002 South African Welterweight Kickboxing Champion

South African Muaythai Federation 
 South African Muay Thai Middleweight Champion

Professional Kickboxing Council 
 South African Professional Kickboxing Council (P.K.C) Middleweight Champion

Kickboxing record

|-  bgcolor="#c5d2ea"
| 2019-05-28 || Draw ||align=left| Yodwicha Banchamek || MAS Fight|| Hong Kong || Draw|| 1 || 9:00
|-
|-  bgcolor="#CCFFCC"
| 2016-11-05|| Win ||align=left| Zheng Zhaoyu || Wu Lin Feng || China ||  Decision(Extra Round) || 4 || 3:00
|-
|-  bgcolor="#CCFFCC"
| 2016-07-31 || Win ||align=left| Nurla Mulali || Kunlun Fight 48 || Jining, China || Decision(Extra Round)	 || 4 || 3:00 
|-
|-  bgcolor="#FFBBBB"
| 2016-06-05 || Loss ||align=left|  Bo fufan || Kunlun Fight 45   || Chengdu, China || Decision(Unanimous) || 3 || 3:00
|-
|-  bgcolor="#CCFFCC"
| 2015-01-03 || Win ||align=left| Duoli Chen || Kunlun Fight 15: The World MAX Return || Nanjing, China || Decision || 3 || 3:00 
|-
|-  bgcolor="#CCFFCC"
| 2014-06-29 || Win ||align=left| Xu Zhenguang || Kunlun Fight 6 || Chongqing, China || Decision || 3 || 3:00
|-
|-  bgcolor="#FFBBBB"
| 2012-12-31 || Loss ||align=left| Wang Wei Hao || Wu Lin Feng 70 kg Tournament, Quarter Finals || Beijing, China || Decision || 3 || 3:00
|-
|-  bgcolor="#FFBBBB"
| 2011-11-05 || Loss ||align=left| Aotegen Bateer || Hero Legend || Changsha, China || Decision || 3 || 3:00
|-
|-  bgcolor="#FFBBBB"
| 2011-09-25 || Loss ||align=left| Frank Giorgi || Thai Fight 2011 70 kg Tournament, Quarter Final || Bangkok, Thailand || Decision || 3 || 3:00
|-
|-  bgcolor="#FFBBBB"
| 2011-04-23 || Loss ||align=left| Ky Hollenbeck || W.C.K. Muaythai Show || Hainan Island, China || Decision || 5 || 3:00
|-
! style=background:white colspan=9 |
|-
|-  bgcolor="#CCFFCC"
| 2011-01-21 || Win ||align=left| Zhou Zhipeng || Wu Lin Feng || Xi'an, China || Decision || 3 || 3:00
|-
|-  bgcolor="#FFBBBB"
| 2010-12-05 || Loss ||align=left| Yodsaenklai Fairtex || Kings Cup (Super 8 Tournament) || Bangkok, Thailand || Decision || 3 || 3:00
|-  bgcolor="#CCFFCC"
| 2010-08-14 || Win ||align=left| Hong Guang || Wu Lin Feng || Henan, China || Decision || 3 || 3:00
|-
|-  bgcolor="#CCFFCC"
| 2010-05-28 || Win ||align=left| Dong Wenfei || Wu Lin Feng (Final)|| Henan, China || Ext.R. Decision || 4 || 3:00
|-
! style=background:white colspan=9 |
|-
|-  bgcolor="#CCFFCC"
| 2010-04-03 || Win ||align=left| Zhou Jian Kun || Wu Lin Feng (Semi-final) || Henan, China || Decision || 3 || 3:00
|-  bgcolor="#CCFFCC"
| 2010-03-29 || Win ||align=left| Yang Zhuo || Wu Lin Feng (Quarter-final) || Henan, China || Decision || 3 || 3:00
|-  bgcolor="#CCFFCC"
| 2010-02-13 || Win ||align=left| Yodsaenklai Fairtex || Boxe-Thai Guinea Tournament 2 || Malabo, Equatorial Guinea || Decision (Unanimous) || 5 || 3:00
|-  bgcolor="#FFBBBB"
| 2010-01-?? || Loss ||align=left| Armen Petrosyan || Enfusion Kickboxing Tournament, 1st Round|| Koh Samui, Thailand || Decision || 3 || 3:00
|-  bgcolor="#CCFFCC"
| 2010-01-03 || Win ||align=left| Yang Tong Hsiung || Wu Lin Feng || Henan, China || KO || 2 || 0:20
|-  bgcolor="#FFBBBB"
| 2009-11-07 || Loss ||align=left| Madsua || I-1 Grand Extreme 2009 - Asian Title (Final) || Macau || Decision (Unanimous)|| 3 || 3:00
|-
! style=background:white colspan=9 |
|-
|-  bgcolor="#CCFFCC"
| 2009-11-07 || Win ||align=left| Faisal Ramli || I-1 Grand Extreme 2009 - Asian Title (Semi-final) || Macau || Decision (Unanimous)|| 3 || 3:00
|-  bgcolor="#FFBBBB"
| 2009-10-22 || Loss ||align=left| Dmitry Valent || I-1 Grand SLAM 4-Man Tournament (Final)|| Hong Kong || Decision (Split) || 3 || 3:00
|-
! style=background:white colspan=9 |
|-
|-  bgcolor="#CCFFCC"
| 2009-10-22 || Win ||align=left| Abdoul Olay Toure || I-1 Grand SLAM 4-Man Tournament (Semi-final)|| Hong Kong || KO || 3 || 3:00
|-  bgcolor="#CCFFCC"
| 2009-09-20 || Win ||align=left| Du Guangqiang || Wu Lin Feng || Zhengzhou, China || Decision (Unanimous)|| 3 || 3:00
|-
|-  bgcolor="#FFBBBB"
| 2009-05-23 || Loss ||align=left| Dong Wenfei || Wu Lin Feng || Zhengzhou, China || Decision (Split)|| 5 || 2:00
|-
|-  bgcolor="#FFBBBB"
| 2009-03-26 || Loss ||align=left| Yodsanklai Fairtex || Les Stars du Ring || Levallois-Perret, France || Decision (Unanimous)|| 5 || 3:00
|-
|-  bgcolor="#CCFFCC"
| 2009-01-18 || Win ||align=left| Xu Yan || Hero Legend || Beijing, China || Decision (Unanimous)|| 5 || 3:00
|-
|-  bgcolor="#FFBBBB"
| 2008-11-25 || Loss ||align=left| Yodsaenklai Fairtex || Planet Battle || Hong Kong || Decision || 3 || 3:00
|-
|-  bgcolor="#FFBBBB"
| 2008-06-25 || Loss ||align=left| Naruepol Fairtex || Planet Battle || Hong Kong || Decision || 3 || 3:00
|-
|-  bgcolor="#CCFFCC"
| 2008-03-30 || Win ||align=left| Sinbi Taewoong || The Khan 1 || Seoul, South Korea || Ext.R. Decision (Unanimous) || 4 || 3:00
|-
|-  bgcolor="#CCFFCC"
| 2007-07-21 || Win ||align=left| Jae Mun Choi || K-1 Fighting Network Khan 2007 || Seoul, South Korea || Decision (Unanimous) || 3 || 3:00
|-
|-  bgcolor="#FFBBBB"
| 2006-10-14 || Loss ||align=left| Goran Borovic || K-1 Rules Africa Bomba-Yaa 2006 || Johannesburg, South Africa || Decision || 5 || 3:00
|-
! style=background:white colspan=9 |
|-
|-  bgcolor="#CCFFCC"
| 2006-09-16 || Win ||align=left| Jae-Sik Choi || K-1 Fighting Network KHAN 2006 in Seoul || Seoul, South Korea || KO || 1 || 2:59
|-
|-  bgcolor="#CCFFCC"
| 2005-05-06 || Win ||align=left| Solly Poo || Corausel || Pretoria, South Africa || KO || 1 || 0:30
|-
|-  bgcolor="#CCFFCC"
| 2005-02-28 || Win ||align=left| Leon Mynahardt || Fight Extravaganza || Durban, South Africa || KO || 3 || 2:13
|-
|-  bgcolor="#CCFFCC"
| 2004-11-26 || Win ||align=left| Lucky Notshele || United Fighting Alliance || Johannesburg, South Africa || Decision || 5 || 3:00
|-
|-  bgcolor="#FFBBBB"
| 2004-02-28 || Loss ||align=left| Behrouz Rastagar || Rising-Sun || Arnhem, Netherlands || Decision || 5 || 3:00
|-
|-  bgcolor="#CCFFCC"
| 2003-10-11 || Win ||align=left| Moeti Moholo || Rika's Promotions || Pretoria, South Africa || TKO (Corner stoppage) || 3 || 3:00
|-
|-  bgcolor="#FFBBBB"
| 2003-09-14 || Loss ||align=left| Neil Woods || Thai Boxing World Championship || Liverpool, United Kingdom || TKO (Corner stoppage)|| 5 || 3:00
|-
! style=background:white colspan=9 |
|-
|-  bgcolor="#CCFFCC"
| 2003-05-10 || Win ||align=left| Amos Hlatswayo || Challenge of Champs || Johannesburg, South Africa || KO || 4 || 2:30
|-
|-  bgcolor="#CCFFCC"
| 2002-08-31 || Win ||align=left| Patrick Mahlango || South African Championships || Johannesburg, South Africa || KO || 4 || 2:30
|-
! style=background:white colspan=9 |
|-
|-  bgcolor="#CCFFCC"
| 2002-06-29 || Win ||align=left| Davi Otto || The Jungle War Championship || Johannesburg, South Africa || Decision (Unanimous) || 5 || 3:00
|-
|-
| colspan=9 | Legend:

Mixed martial arts record

| Win
| align=center|8–5
| Marcelo Tenorio
| TKO (punches)
| IMPI World Series: Asia 4
| 
| align=center| 3
| align=center| 2:32
| Hong Kong, Hong Kong
|
|-
| Loss
| align=center|7–5
| Elnur Agaev
| TKO (punches)
| Kunlun Fight 44
| 
| align=center| 2
| align=center| 0:40
| Khabarovsk, Russia
|
|-
| Win
| align=center| 7–4
| Caros Fodor
| Decision (unanimous)
| ONE FC: Moment of Truth
| 
| align=center| 3
| align=center| 5:00
| Pasay, Philippines
| 
|-
| Win
| align=center| 6–4
| Kotetsu Boku
| Decision (unanimous)
| ONE FC: Champions and Warriors
| 
| align=center| 3
| align=center| 5:00
| Jakarta, Indonesia
| 
|-
| Loss
| align=center| 5–4
| Lowen Tynanes
| Submission (rear-naked choke)
| ONE FC: Return of Warriors
| 
| align=center| 3
| align=center| 4:37
| Kuala Lumpur, Malaysia
| 
|-
| Loss
| align=center| 5–3
| Yui Chul Nam
| Decision (split)
| Road FC 10: Monson vs Kang
| 
| align=center| 3
| align=center| 5:00
| Busan, South Korea
| 
|-
| Win
| align=center| 5–2
| Seok Mo Kim 
| TKO (knees and punches)
| Road FC 9: Beatdown
| 
| align=center| 1
| align=center| 4:38
| Wonju, South Korea
| 
|-
| Loss
| align=center| 4–2
| Yui Chul Nam
| Decision (unanimous)
| Road FC 5: Night of Champions
| 
| align=center| 3
| align=center| 5:00
| Seoul, South Korea
| 
|-
| Win
| align=center| 4–1
| Xing Yu Ma
| TKO (punches)
| ONE FC 1: Champion vs. Champion
| 
| align=center| 1
| align=center| 0:49
| Kallang, Singapore
| 
|-
| Win 
| align=center| 3–1
| Stefan Lukovnikov 
| Submission (armbar) 
| Draka: Governor's Cup 2010 
|  
| align=center| 1
| align=center| 4:59
| Khabarovsk, Russia 
| 
|-
| Loss 
| align=center| 2–1
| Eduard Folayang 
| Decision (unanimous)
| Martial Combat 12
|  
| align=center| 3 
| align=center| 5:00
| Sentosa, Singapore
| 
|-
| Win 
| align=center| 2–0
| Alex Niu 
| KO (punches) 
| Martial Combat  7
|  
| align=center| 2
| align=center| N/A
| Sentosa, Singapore 
| 
|-
| Win 
| align=center| 1–0
| John Vargas 
| Submission (rear-naked choke) 
| Fury 1: Clash of the Titans
|  
| align=center| 1 
| align=center| N/A
| Cotai, Macau 
|

References

External links

 Article on Vuyisile Colossa, BC Magazine, Hong Kong
 Interview with iafrica.com
 K-1sport.de Vuyisile Colossa Profile
 Vuyisile Colossa Highlights
 Naruepol Fairtex vs Vuyisile Colossa, PLANET BATTLE

1982 births
Living people
South African male kickboxers
Middleweight kickboxers
South African male mixed martial artists
Lightweight mixed martial artists
Mixed martial artists utilizing Muay Thai
South African Muay Thai practitioners
Kunlun Fight kickboxers
Kunlun Fight MMA Fighters